Skiff Lake is a lake in Canterbury Parish, York County, New Brunswick, Canada.

Location
Skiff Lake is a glacier lake in southwestern New Brunswick, Canada, near the village of Canterbury.  There are 27 islands scattered throughout the lake. Surrounding the lake are large granite boulders which may have been formed from one of the eruptions of Mount Pleasant Caldera.

History

Skiff Lake was named by Lord Northcote in 18??, who paddled a skiff over to an island that he had claimed. This island is now known as Northcote island. A cottage was built on Northcote island which was the first camp on an island on Skiff Lake.  There is a camp named "Lady of the Lake" that is the oldest camp on the lake, on the eastern shore of the lake.

There haves been several outfitters on Skiff Lake. These include: Crombies camps, Foulke Camps, Skiff Lake Outfitters, Skiff Lake Inn.

Fish species
Fish found in the lake include:
Land-locked salmon,
Smallmouth bass,
Brook trout,
American eel,
White perch,
white sucker,
Burbot aka cusk,
Smelts,
Sunfish, and
pickerel.

Other animals
Non-fish species found on or around the lake include:
loon,
mallard,
black duck,
common merganser,
tern,
ruby-throated hummingbird,
common snapping turtle,
red fox,
bald eagle,
pileated woodpecker,
white tail deer,
moose,
black bear,
beaver, American mink, blue jay, and Canada goose.

Myths and legends
There have long been rumours that Skiff Lake has its very own Nessy.  This lake-locked serpent, affectionately referred to as Gertrude, is rumoured to have been upwards of thirty feet in length.

Ice out dates

See also
List of lakes of New Brunswick

References

External links
 Franciscan Shrine

Pictures and videos
  Skiff Lake Rainbows
 Ice Run/Luge Winter Fun
 Morning Glow
 Skiff Lake YouTube Video

Lakes of New Brunswick
Landforms of York County, New Brunswick
Tourist attractions in York County, New Brunswick